Phyzelaphryne miriamae, commonly known as Miriam's frog, is a species of frog in the family Eleutherodactylidae. It is endemic to Brazil where it is found in the drainage of Madeira and Tapajos rivers, in the southern Amazon Basin. It might also occur in Bolivia.

Phyzelaphryne miriamae is found in leaf-litter in lowland rainforests. It is locally threatened by habitat loss.

References

Eleutherodactylidae
Amphibians described in 1977
Amphibians of Brazil
Endemic fauna of Brazil
Taxonomy articles created by Polbot